IWNA can refer to
Independent Workers of North America, defunct labor union in the United States
 International Workshop on Nanotechnology and Application
Iran Women's News Agency (IWNA) founded by Shahla Habibi
Inner West Neighbour Aid, charity in New South Wales, Australia
International Workshop on Networked Appliances, a conference organized by the Institute of Electrical and Electronics Engineers